Nakatsu is a city in Ōita Prefecture, Japan.

Nakatsu may also refer to:

Nakatsu, Wakayama, a former village in Hidaka District, Wakayama Prefecture, Japan
Nakatsu Station (disambiguation), multiple railway stations in Japan
Nakatsu River, a river of Iwate Prefecture, Japan
Nakatsu Domain, a former Japanese domain

People with the surname
, Japanese voice actress and actress

Japanese-language surnames